The 1975 Soviet Chess Championship was the 43rd edition of USSR Chess Championship. Held from 28 November to 22 December 1975 in Yerevan. Former world champion Tigran Petrosian won his fourth title. The qualifying tournaments took place in Cheliabinsk and Kishinev.

Table and results

References 

USSR Chess Championships
Championship
Chess
1975 in chess
Chess